The Army University is a professional military education university system of the United States Army. It is the largest professional military education system in the world, with over 150,000 soldiers educated in more than 88 occupations across its worldwide network of 70 schools. Approximately 25% of its curriculum is currently accredited, primarily for officer training; however, initiatives are underway to accredit all enlisted training as well.

Army University Press
Army University Press is a university press affiliated with Army University. It is based out of Fort Leavenworth, Kansas.

See also 

 Air University
 Marine Corps University
Texas A&M University System

References 

Education government agencies of the United States
Department of Defense Education Activity
Public university systems in the United States
Military education and training
Military education and training in the United States
2015 establishments in the United States
Public universities and colleges in Kansas